The Best of Me is a 2014 American romantic drama film directed by Michael Hoffman and written by Will Fetters and J. Mills Goodloe, based on Nicholas Sparks' 2011 novel of the same name. The film stars James Marsden and Michelle Monaghan with Luke Bracey and Liana Liberato.

Plot
The film -- the story of Dawson and Amanda -- moves between alternate scenes of the couple's relationship in 1992, and their current separate lives.

Dawson Cole works on an oil rig off the coast of Louisiana. An explosion on the job nearly kills him, throwing him into the water, but miraculously he survives. After his recovery months later, Dawson learns that his close friend and surrogate father—Tuck—has died and returns home for the first time in almost twenty years to carry out Tuck's final wishes.

When he arrives at Tuck's house, Dawson is surprised to find that Tuck also arranged for Dawson's high school girlfriend, Amanda, to join him. It seems that Tuck's intention was to heal the hurt between Dawson and Amanda. However, Amanda is now married.

Dawson was born into a notorious backwoods criminal family with an abusive father. In flashbacks, it is revealed that as a teenager, he left his father's home and stayed overnight in Tuck Hostetler's garage. Tuck, a local mechanic who had recently lost his wife, allowed Dawson to live with him and eventually considered him a son of his own.

Dawson and Amanda attended the same high school and began dating, soon falling in love. On the afternoon of the prom, Dawson's father and brothers beat Tuck. Dawson, angered, goes to his father's with the intent of killing him with Tuck's rifle. However, they scuffle, and Dawson's cousin, an expectant teen father, is accidentally killed. In exchange for a lighter sentence, Dawson testifies against his father and brothers. Since Dawson would not be paroled for at least four years, he cut ties with Amanda, forcing her to choose college over staying with him.

After Tuck's death, Amanda and Dawson meet with Tuck's lawyer and learn that they are to scatter Tuck's ashes at a cottage he owned with his wife. Later, Dawson and Amanda spend a passionate night together. They have lunch and discuss their plans, during which Dawson is reminded by Amanda that she had continued to try to visit him in prison. The following day, Amanda decides to return to her family and her strained marriage, to fulfill her family commitments.

When Amanda goes home, Dawson remains at Tuck's to restore the garden. However, she later decides to split up with her husband, and she leaves Dawson a voicemail expressing her love. Before anything more can happen between them, Dawson is attacked and almost killed by his brothers, having been almost pushed in front of a moving train. Dawson knocks them out, but after calling 911, he is spotted by his father across the railroad tracks and is shot dead.

Meanwhile, Amanda gets a call that her son has been in a car accident. On arriving at the hospital, the doctor tells her he needs a new heart. That same night, the doctors tell her they had found a donor. While sleeping, Amanda has a dream of Dawson sitting on the side of her bed when she is awoken by the doorbell being rung by her mother, who has come to tell her that Dawson had been shot and killed by his father.

One year later, Amanda gets a call from her son telling her he found out who the donor was and that maybe she knew him: Dawson Cole. Shocked and happy upon hearing this, she drives back to the house Tuck had left them. It is there that she reads the letter Dawson had left her, telling her how much he loved her. She proceeds to take a walk through the garden Dawson had beautifully arranged for her before he died.

Cast
 James Marsden as Dawson Cole
 Luke Bracey as young Dawson
 Michelle Monaghan as Amanda Collier-Reynolds
 Liana Liberato as young Amanda
 Sebastian Arcelus as Frank Reynolds
 Gerald McRaney as Tuck Hostetler
 Sean Bridgers as Tommy Cole
 Rob Mello as Ted Cole
 Hunter Burke as Abee Cole
 Jon Tenney as Harvey Collier
 Caroline Goodall as Evelyn Collier
 Ian Nelson as Jared Reynolds 
 Schuyler Fisk as Older April
 Robby Rasmussen as Bobby Cole / Aaron Cole
 Julia Lashae as Clara

Production

Development
On June 17, 2011, Warner Bros. acquired the film rights to the novel The Best of Me by Nicholas Sparks. On March 15, 2012, it was announced that the studio had tapped screenwriter J. Mills Goodloe to adapt the book.

On September 27, it was reported that Warner Bros. was in final talks with Michael Hoffman to direct the film, Will Fetters was set to rewrite the screenplay, marking his second adaptation of a Nicholas Sparks novel, and Denise Di Novi was set to produce the film, along with Sparks and Sparks' agent Theresa Park as co-producers, marking Di Novi's fifth film collaboration with Sparks, Sparks' second time producing a film adaptation of one of his novels and Park's production debut. On July 25, 2013, Relativity Media acquired the distribution rights from Warner Bros., marking the studio's third film adaptation of a Nicholas Sparks novel. On October 22, Michelle Monaghan was cast to play the female lead Amanda Collier, and Ryan Kavanaugh was to co-produce the film. On October 24, the studio set the film for an October 17, 2014 release.

On January 9, 2014, the studio offered James Marsden, who co-starred in the 2004 adaptation of Sparks' 1996 novel The Notebook to play the male lead Dawson Cole, replacing Paul Walker after his death. On January 28, Liana Liberato joined the film's cast as the younger version of Monaghan's character, Amanda Collier. On February 12, Luke Bracey was added to the cast to play the younger version of Marsden's character, Dawson Cole. On March 12, Sebastian Arcelus and Gerald McRaney joined the cast of the film. Arcelus played Frank Reynolds, Amanda's husband and father of her children, while McRaney played Tuck, a widower who takes in young Dawson and becomes a friend and father-figure to him. On March 25, Jon Tenney was added to the cast to play Harvey Collier, the father of Amanda.

Filming
Principal photography began on March 6, 2014 in New Orleans, Louisiana for a 42-day shoot. On April 30 and May 1 the filming took place in the downtown Covington area. Also filming took place in parts of Pearl River, Louisiana.

Post-production
On June 27, 2014, it was announced that composer Aaron Zigman would be scoring the music for the film.

Soundtrack

The soundtrack album for the film, released on October 7, 2014, features original music primarily from the genre of country music, recorded by artists such as Lady Antebellum, Hunter Hayes, David Nail, Colbie Caillat, Kip Moore, Eli Young Band, Eric Paslay, Thompson Square, and Thomas Rhett. "I Did with You" by Lady Antebellum was released on September 8, 2014 as the first promotional single from the soundtrack. The band's other contribution, "Falling for You" is also available on the deluxe edition of their fifth studio album, 747.

The titles and performing artists were published by Taste of Country.

Commercial performance
The album debuted at number 54 on the Billboard 200, selling 6,200 copies in its first week.

Chart performance

Reception

Box office
The Best of Me opened in North America on October 17, 2014 across 2,936 theaters. It has grossed $26.8 million in North America and $9.2 million in other territories for a worldwide total of $35.9 million.

In its opening weekend, the film grossed $10 million finishing fifth at the box office behind Fury, Gone Girl, The Book of Life and Alexander and the Terrible, Horrible, No Good, Very Bad Day, making it the worst opening for a Nicholas Sparks' novel adaptation.

Critical reception
The Best of Me was panned by critics. , the film scored a 12% approval rating on Rotten Tomatoes, based on 82 reviews with an average rating of 3.64 out of 10. The site's consensus read, "At nine films and counting, the line between Nicholas Sparks film fans and detractors is clear, and The Best of Me will change few minds on either side of the divide." On Metacritic, the film scored 29 out of 100, based on 26 critics, indicating "generally unfavorable reviews". In CinemaScore polls conducted during the opening weekend, cinema audiences gave The Best of Me an average grade of "B+" on an A+ to F scale.

Home media
The Best of Me was released on DVD and Blu-ray on February 3, 2015. At the same time, a "Tears of Joy" edition of the film with a running time of 115 minutes and an alternated ending was released on DVD and Blu-ray.

References

External links
 
 
 
 

2014 films
2014 romantic drama films
American romantic drama films
Films directed by Michael Hoffman
Films based on works by Nicholas Sparks
Films based on romance novels
Films scored by Aaron Zigman
Films shot in New Orleans
Films shot in Louisiana
Films set in 1992
Films set in 2013
Films set in 2014
Films set in North Carolina
Relativity Media films
Films produced by Denise Di Novi
Filicide in fiction
2010s English-language films
2010s American films